Cameron Sutcliffe (born 23 May 1992) is an Australian rules footballer who has played for the Port Adelaide Football Club in the Australian Football League (AFL). He previously played for the Fremantle Football Club from 2012 to 2018. He has also played for and been captain of Port Adelaide's reserves team in the South Australian National Football League (SANFL).

Football career

Fremantle 

He was recruited by Fremantle Football Club in the 2011 National Draft, with pick #71 from Woodville-West Torrens in the South Australian National Football League (SANFL).  He was the third last player chosen in the draft and the last teenager selected.

Sutcliffe made his AFL debut in Round 15, 2012, against  at Subiaco Oval.

He played in Fremantle's first Grand Final in 2013, which saw them go down to Hawthorn by 15 points.

Port Adelaide 

After being delisted by Fremantle, Sutcliffe joined the Port Adelaide Magpies in the SANFL as their captain for the 2019 season. He was again named captain of the Port Adelaide Magpies in 2021, as the club rejoined the competition. He was selected to represent South Australia against Western Australia in their interstate match in 2021.

References

External links

WAFL Statistics

 

1992 births
Living people
Fremantle Football Club players
East Fremantle Football Club players
Woodville-West Torrens Football Club players
Australian rules footballers from South Australia
Peel Thunder Football Club players
Port Adelaide Football Club (SANFL) players
Port Adelaide Football Club players